Hoefler may refer to:
 Don Hoefler, American journalist credited with coining the term "Silicon Valley"
 Jonathan Hoefler, American typeface designer
 Hoefler & Co., type foundry based in New York
 Hoefler Text, serif typeface designed by Jonathan Hoefler

See also
 Höfler